, also known by his Chinese style name , was a bureaucrat of the Ryukyu Kingdom.

Oroku Ryōwa was a son of Hamamoto Ryōkyō. He was adopted by Oroku Ryōei because Ryōei had no heir. Later, he became the tenth head of the aristocratic family called Ba-uji Oroku Dunchi.

King Shō Kō dispatched a gratitude envoy for his accession to Edo, Japan in 1806. They sailed back in the next year.

He served as a member of Sanshikan from 1811 to 1818.

References

1765 births
1818 deaths
Ueekata
Sanshikan
People of the Ryukyu Kingdom
18th-century Ryukyuan people
19th-century Ryukyuan people